Jordan Harvey (born January 28, 1984) is an American former professional soccer player who last played for Major League Soccer club Los Angeles FC.

Career

Youth and college
Harvey started playing club soccer with Strikers FC. Upon high school graduation he played college soccer at the University of California, Los Angeles for four years from 2002 to 2005 where he appeared in 69 games scoring 7 goals and notching 9 assists. During his college years he also played with Orange County Blue Star in the USL Premier Development League.

Professional career
Harvey was drafted in the first round, 9th overall, in the 2006 MLS Supplemental Draft by the Colorado Rapids, and remained with the club for a number of years. He was his team's the leader in minutes having played – 2,613 – in the 2009 MLS season

He was selected by Philadelphia Union in the 2009 MLS Expansion Draft on November 25, 2009. Harvey scored his first goal for the Union off a header on April 15, 2010, in a 2–1 loss to Toronto FC.

On July 7, 2011, Harvey was traded to the Vancouver Whitecaps FC in exchange for allocation money. Harvey established himself as one of the starting left backs during the 2012 season when Alain Rochat moved to defensive midfield towards the end of the season.

International
Harvey played 2 matches for the United States U-17 national team in the 2001 FIFA U-17 World Cup and one match for the United States U-20 national team in the 2003 FIFA U-20 World Cup.

Career statistics

Honors
Vancouver Whitecaps FC
Canadian Championship: 2015

Los Angeles FC
Supporters' Shield: 2019

Individual
Vancouver Whitecaps FC Player of the Year: 2016

References

External links
 

1984 births
Living people
American soccer players
American expatriate soccer players
UCLA Bruins men's soccer players
Orange County Blue Star players
Colorado Rapids players
Seattle Sounders (1994–2008) players
Philadelphia Union players
Vancouver Whitecaps FC players
Los Angeles FC players
Soccer players from California
Sportspeople from Mission Viejo, California
Expatriate soccer players in Canada
USL League Two players
USL First Division players
Major League Soccer players
United States men's youth international soccer players
United States men's under-20 international soccer players
Colorado Rapids draft picks
Association football defenders